Skyactivs Hiroshima (formerly Mazda Blue Zoomers) are a Japanese rugby union team who compete in the Japan Rugby League One. They were formerly owned by car manufacturers Mazda based in Fuchū, Hiroshima, Japan. The team rebranded as Skyactivs Hiroshima, dropping the Mazda name, ahead of the rebranding of the Top League to the Japan Rugby League One in 2022.

Squad

The Skyactivs Hiroshima squad for the 2023 season is:

See also
2007–08 Top League

References

External links
 

Sports teams in Hiroshima Prefecture
Blue Zoomers
Japan Rugby League One teams